A list of fantasy films released in the 1960s.

List

1960s
Fantasy